The 1998-99 Tennents Highland League Cup was the 54th edition of the Highland League's premier knock-out football competition.  The winners were Forres Mechanics, who defeated Keith 1-0 in the final at Borough Briggs in Elgin.

Group stage

The first stage of the Cup was a group stage consisting of four groups, called districts, of four teams. The four group winners qualified for the semi-finals.

District 1

District 2

District 3

District 4

Semi-finals

Ties in the semi-finals took place on Saturday 1 May

Final

References

The Official Football Association Non League Club Directory 2000  

Highland League Cup seasons